Andi Mattalatta Stadium was a multi-purpose stadium in Makassar, South Sulawesi, Indonesia.  It was used mostly for football matches. The stadium held 15,000 people and was the home stadium of PSM Makassar. This stadium was the center of the event National Sports Week the 4th in 1957. The stadium was inaugurated for use on July 6, 1957 or two months before the opening of National Sports Week the 4th in 1957 in Makassar.

Historically, this stadium was located on or very near to the Japanese POW camp during World War II.

On 21 October 2020, this stadium was demolished.

References 

PSM Makassar
Sports venues in Indonesia
Football venues in Indonesia
Multi-purpose stadiums in Indonesia
Sports venues in South Sulawesi
Football venues in South Sulawesi
Multi-purpose stadiums in South Sulawesi
Sports venues in Makassar
Football venues in Makassar
Multi-purpose stadiums in Makassar
Buildings and structures in South Sulawesi
Buildings and structures in Makassar
Stadiums under construction